Lehmer is a surname. Notable people with the surname include:

 Derrick Norman Lehmer (1867–1938), number theorist who produced tables of prime factors and mechanical devices like Lehmer sieves
 Derrick Henry Lehmer (1905–1991), number theorist known for Lucas–Lehmer test, son of D. N. Lehmer and husband of Emma Lehmer
 Emma Lehmer (1906–2007), Russian mathematician, known for her work on reciprocity laws, wife of D. H. Lehmer
 Kat Lehmer, American film director, writer, actor and artist

See also 
 Derrick Lehmer (disambiguation)
 Lehmer–Schur algorithm, in mathematics, named after Derrick Henry Lehmer
 Lehmer code
 Lehmer's conjecture (also known as: the Lehmer's Mahler measure problem), a problem in number theory, after Derrick Henry Lehmer
 Lehmer five, named after Dick Lehmer
 Lehmer's GCD algorithm, named after Derrick Henry Lehmer, a rather fast GCD algorithm
 Lehmer matrix, in mathematics, named after Derrick Henry Lehmer
 Lehmer mean, named after Derrick Henry Lehmer
 Lehmer number, in mathematics
 Lehmer's polynomial, named after Derrick Henry Lehmer
 Lucas–Lehmer primality test, in mathematics, after Derrick Henry Lehmer
 Lehmer random number generator, named after D. H. Lehmer
 Lehmer sieve
 Lucas–Lehmer test
 Lucas–Lehmer–Riesel test, in mathematics

See also
 Lemer (disambiguation)
 Lemmer (surname)